The following is a timeline of the history of the municipality of Setúbal, Portugal.

Prior to 20th century

 1249 - Foral (charter) initiated.
 ca. 1490
 Monastery of Jesus of Setúbal founded.
 Setúbal Aqueduct built.
 1531 - 26 January: Earthquake.
 1570 - Our Lady of Grace church built.
 1755 - 1 November: Earthquake.
 1765 - Poet Manuel Maria Barbosa du Bocage born in Setubal.
 1814 - Roman ruins of Tróia discovered near Setubal.
 1836 - Doca Delpeut (dock) built.
 1850 - Roman ruins of Tróia near Setubal excavated.
 1858 - Earthquake.
 1859 - Cisne do Sado newspaper begins publication.
 1860
 Correio de Setúbal newspaper begins publication.
 Setúbal attains city status.
 1861 -  opens; Linha do Sul begins operating.
 1871 - Bocage monument erected.
 1899 - Comércio de Setúbal newspaper begins publication.
 1900 - Population: 22,074.

20th century
 1909 
Republican Congress held. 
Benavente earthquake causes some damage. 
 1910
 4–5 October: City Hall burns down.
 Vitória F.C. (football club) formed.
 1911 - Population: 30,346.
 1913 - Campo dos Arcos (sport field) established.(pt)
 1917 - União Futebol Comércio e Indústria football club formed.
 1920 -  railway station opens.
 1926 - City becomes seat of the newly formed Setúbal District.
 1927 - Setúbal Football Association organized.
 1933 - Banco de Portugal building constructed.
 1956 - Cineclube de Setúbal formed.
 1962 - Estádio do Bonfim (stadium) opens.
 1965 - Arquivo Distrital de Setúbal (archive) established.
 1966 - Cais Comercial (commercial pier) built in the port.
 1975 - Roman Catholic Diocese of Setúbal established; Manuel da Silva Martins becomes bishop.
 1976 - Teatro Animação de Setúbal (theatre) founded.
 1981 -  opens.
 1982 - City twinned with Beauvais, France.
 1983 - City joins the Associação de Municípios do Distrito de Setúbal.
 1985
  begins broadcasting.
 Roll-on/roll-off terminal built in the port.
 1986 - 14 July: Bombing by Organização Revolucionária Armada.
 1993 - Ford automotive plant begins operating (approximate date).
 1998 -  becomes bishop.

21st century
 2001
 Mun-setubal.pt website online (approximate date).
 Population: 113,934.
 Carlos de Sousa becomes mayor.
 2006 -  becomes mayor.
 2011 
 Population: 121,185.
 2015 - José Ornelas Carvalho becomes bishop.

Images

See also

 , Roman settlement
 
 
 Other names of Setúbal (e.g. St Ubes)
 List of cities in Portugal
 :Category:City timelines, for other cities/municipalities in Portugal: Timeline of Braga, Timeline of Coimbra, Timeline of Funchal (Madeira), Timeline of Lisbon, Timeline of Porto

References

Bibliography

in English
 
 
 

in Portuguese

External links

 Arquivo Municipal de Setúbal (municipal archive)
 Arquivo Distrital de Setúbal (district archive)
  (Images, etc.)
  (Images, etc.)
 

Setúbal
Setubal
Years in Portugal
setubal